Manourou Gakou (born January 12, 1983 in Paris, France) is a French basketball player who played professionally for French Pro A league club Chalon during the 2002-2003 season.

References

French men's basketball players
1983 births
Basketball players from Paris
Living people